Santiago Rosa (born 15 August 1997) is an Argentine professional footballer who plays as a forward for Gimnasia Jujuy.

Career
Rosa's career started with Sarmiento of the Primera División, after joining their academy in 2007. Having made substitute appearances against Defensa y Justicia and Vélez Sarsfield, Rosa made his starting debut during a 2–3 win away to Atlético de Rafaela; though they ended the campaign with relegation. No appearances followed in the 2017–18 Primera B Nacional, but he returned to the first-team set-up under Iván Delfino in 2018–19; featuring five times in the first half of the season, during which period he also netted his first senior goal versus Platense.

In July 2019, Rosa was loaned to Spain with Peña Deportiva B; he was initially signed for their senior team, though later wasn't registered. He scored once, versus AE Santa Gertrudis, in six appearances in Regional Preferente Ibiza/Formentera. Rosa headed back to Sarmiento in early 2020. In January 2021, Rosa completed a loan return to Spanish football with Tercera División side Ciudad de Lucena; the move had been delayed for months due to bureaucratic issues. He debuted in a 1–0 defeat away to Sevilla C on 17 January.

At the end of July 2021, Rosa joined Gimnasia Jujuy.

Career statistics
.

References

External links

1997 births
Living people
People from Junín, Buenos Aires
Argentine footballers
Association football forwards
Argentine expatriate footballers
Expatriate footballers in Spain
Argentine expatriate sportspeople in Spain
Argentine Primera División players
Primera Nacional players
Divisiones Regionales de Fútbol players
Tercera División players
Club Atlético Sarmiento footballers
CD Ciudad de Lucena players
Gimnasia y Esgrima de Jujuy footballers
Sportspeople from Buenos Aires Province